Loona Odd Eye Circle (commonly stylized as LOONA ODD EYE CIRCLE or LOOΠΔ ODD EYE CIRCLE, often shortened as OEC) is the second sub-unit of South Korean girl group Loona, formed through a pre-debut project titled  "Girl of the Month". The sub-unit consists of 3 members: Kim Lip, JinSoul and Choerry. They debuted on September 21, 2017, with the extended play Mix & Match.

History

Pre-debut: Revealing of the members 
On May 11, 2017, the first member, Kim Lip, was revealed. She debuted with her single album Kim Lip on May 23, 2017, with the title track "Eclipse". The next member to be revealed was JinSoul, who had earlier made a one-second appearance with one of the previously revealed members, ViVi, in her solo music video titled "Everyday I Need You". JinSoul was officially revealed on June 13, 2017. Then, she debuted with her single album JinSoul on June 26, 2017, with the title track "Singing in the Rain". On July 12, 2017, the last member and the maknae of the unit, Choerry, was revealed. She debuted with her single album Choerry with the title track "Love Cherry Motion" on July 28, 2017.

2017-present: Debut with Mix & Match, Max & Match 
A teaser titled "Reveal" was released on August 30, 2017. The teaser showed "Odd Eye Circle" as the name of the sub-unit. On September 17, a teaser revealing their title track, "Girl Front" for their upcoming debut was released. A day later, on September 18, the preview for their upcoming extended play, Mix & Match, was released. The sub-unit officially debuted on September 21, 2017, with the release of their EP Mix & Match and a music video for "Girl Front". They had their first music show appearance on Mnet's M Countdown.

On September 23, the English version of one of their songs from Mix & Match, "Loonatic", was released with the music video.

On October 31, a reissue of their extended play Mix & Match titled Max & Match was released with the addition of two tracks and the new lead single "Sweet Crazy Love" along with its music video.

Members 
 Kim Lip (김립) (Leader)
 JinSoul (진솔)
 Choerry (최리)

Discography

Extended plays

Reissues

Singles

Videography

Music videos

References

Loona (group)
Musical groups established in 2017
2017 establishments in South Korea